Red currant is a common name for several plants and may refer to:

 Ribes rubrum, a shrub native to western Europe and widely cultivated
 Ribes sanguineum, a shrub native to North America
 Searsia chirindensis, a tree native to southern Africa